J'Von McCormick (born June 8, 1997) is an American professional basketball player for Kocaeli BŞB Kağıtspor of the Turkish Basketball First League. He played college basketball for the Lee Runnin' Rebels and the Auburn Tigers.

Early life and high school career
McCormick attended Mayde Creek High School in Houston, Texas. As a senior, he averaged 25.6 points, 6.9 rebounds and 5.1 assists while shooting 52 percent from the floor. McCormick was named District 29-6A Offensive MVP. He played AAU basketball for Westside Force. McCormick received several Division I scholarship offers out of high school, including Utah, but committed to Lee College.

College career
McCormick played two seasons at Lee College. He posted 4.9 points, 2.1 assists and 2.0 rebounds per game as a freshman. As a sophomore, he averaged 18.5 points, 6.4 assists and 5.3 rebounds per game. He was third-leading scorer in the Region XIV Athletic Conference. On June 13, 2018, McCormick committed to Auburn to serve as a backup to Jared Harper. In the NCAA Tournament Sweet 16, he finished with 10 points, two assists, and two steals in a 97–80 win against North Carolina. He averaged 4.1 points, 1.4 assists, 0.9 rebounds and 0.8 steals per game as a junior, helping the Tigers reach the Final Four. McCormick received Auburn's Sixth Man Award. On January 4, 2020, McCormick scored a career-high 28 points in an 80–68 win against Mississippi State. As a result, he was named SEC player of the week on January 6. As a senior, McCormick averaged 11.7 points, 4 rebounds and 4.5 assists per game.

Professional career
On August 6, 2020, McCormick signed his first professional contract with BC Odessa of the Ukrainian Basketball SuperLeague. In October 2021, he signed with Kocaeli BŞB Kağıtspor of the Turkish Basketball First League.

Career statistics

College

NCAA Division I

|-
| style="text-align:left;"| 2018–19
| style="text-align:left;"| Auburn
| 39 || 0 || 12.2 || .525 || .500 || .615 || .9 || 1.4 || .8 || .1 || 4.1
|-
| style="text-align:left;"| 2019–20
| style="text-align:left;"| Auburn
| 31 || 31 || 31.4 || .384 || .305 || .581 || 4.0 || 4.5 || 1.1 || .1 || 11.7
|- class="sortbottom"
| style="text-align:center;" colspan="2"| Career
| 70 || 31 || 20.7 || .421 || .331 || .590 || 2.3 || 2.7 || .9 || .1 || 7.5

JUCO

|-
| style="text-align:left;"| 2016–17
| style="text-align:left;"| Lee
| 31 || 7 || – || .527 || .333 || .534 || 2.0 || 2.1 || 1.3 || .2 || 4.9
|-
| style="text-align:left;"| 2017–18
| style="text-align:left;"| Lee
| 28 || 28 || – || .428 || .364 || .648 || 5.3 || 6.4 || 1.6 || .5 || 18.5
|- class="sortbottom"
| style="text-align:center;" colspan="2"| Career
| 59 || 35 || – || .448 || .359 || .622 || 3.6 || 4.1 || 1.4 || .3 || 11.4

Personal life
He is the son of Carol McCormick.

References

External links
Auburn Tigers bio
Lee Runnin' Rebels bio

1997 births
Living people
American expatriate basketball people in Turkey
American expatriate basketball people in Ukraine
American men's basketball players
Auburn Tigers men's basketball players
Basketball players from New Orleans
Junior college men's basketball players in the United States
Lee College (Texas) alumni
Point guards